Helen Catherine Steward,  (born 29 May 1965) is a British philosopher and academic. She is currently Professor of Philosophy of Mind and Action at the University of Leeds. Her research focusses on Philosophy of Action, Free Will, Philosophy of Mind and Metaphysics.

Early life and education 
Steward was born on 29 May 1965 in Chester, Cheshire, England. She studied philosophy, politics and economics at St Hilda's College, Oxford, graduating with a Bachelor of Arts (BA) degree in 1986. She then undertook the postgraduate Bachelor of Philosophy (BPhil) at St Cross College, Oxford, which she completed in 1988. She remained at the University of Oxford to undertake a Doctor of Philosophy (DPhil) degree, belonging to St Hugh's College and Lincoln College. Her doctoral thesis was titled "Events, states and processes: the otology of mind", and was submitted in 1992. She completed her DPhil in 1993.

Academic career
Steward was Salveson Junior Fellow at University College, Oxford for the 1990/91 academic year. From 1993 to 2007, she was fellow and tutor in philosophy at Balliol College, Oxford. She joined the University of Leeds in 2007 as an associate professor. Since 2013, she has been Professor of Philosophy of Mind and Action. In February 2015 she was awarded a Research Leadership Fellowship by the Arts and Humanities Research Council. She was president of the Aristotelian Society from 2019 to 2020.

Her interests include the metaphysics and ontology of mind and agency; the free will problem; the relation between humans and animals; and the philosophy of causation and explanation.

In 2021, Steward was elected a Fellow of the British Academy (FBA), the United Kingdom's national academy for the humanities and social sciences.

Bibliography

Books
 A Metaphysics for Freedom, (Oxford: Oxford University Press, 2012) – BBIP podcast
 Agency and Action ed. H. Steward and John Hyman (Cambridge: CUP, 2004).
 The Ontology of Mind: Events, Processes and States (Oxford: OUP, 1997).

Selected articles
 'What is a Continuant?', Proceedings of the Aristotelian Society, Supplementary Volume, LXXXIX, 2015: 109-23
 ‘Do Animals Have Free Will?’, The Philosophers’ Magazine, 68 (1), Apr 2015: 43-48 
 A Metaphysics for Freedom, (Oxford: Oxford University Press, 2012) – BBIP podcast
 ‘Responses’, Inquiry 56 (2013): 681–706. (Contains Steward's responses to the comments of eight authors on her monograph, A Metaphysics for Freedom, to which a special issue of Inquiry was dedicated).
 'Processes, Continuants and Individuals', Mind 122 (2013): 781-812
 'Actions as Processes', Philosophical Perspectives 26:1 (2012): 373-88

References

External links
 Featured Author of the Month: Helen Steward
 Inaugural lecture recording

1965 births
20th-century British philosophers
21st-century British philosophers
Living people
Fellows of the British Academy
Alumni of St Hilda's College, Oxford
Alumni of St Cross College, Oxford
Alumni of St Hugh's College, Oxford
Alumni of Lincoln College, Oxford
Fellows of University College, Oxford
Fellows of Balliol College, Oxford
Academics of the University of Leeds